Hojai railway station is a railway station in Hojai district, Assam, India. Its code is HJI. It serves Hojai town. The station consists of three platforms. The platform is well sheltered.

Major Trains
New Delhi - Agartala Tejas Rajdhani Express
Agartala - Firozpur Tripura Sundari Express
Silchar - Thiruvananthapuram Aronai Superfast Express
Silchar - Coimbatore Superfast Express
Dibrugarh–Kanyakumari Vivek Express
Dibrugarh-Lalgarh Avadh Assam Express
Dibrugarh-Howrah Kamrup Express via Guwahati
Agartala - Sealdah Kanchanjunga Express
Dibrugarh - Lokmanya Tilak Terminus Superfast Express
Dibrugarh–Amritsar Express
New Tinsukia–Rajendra Nagar Weekly Express
Guwahati - Dibrugarh Town Nagaland Express
Guwahati–Silchar Express
Guwahati–Jorhat Town Jan Shatabdi Express
Guwahati - Mariani BG Express
Alipurduar–Lumding Intercity Express
Guwahati–Ledo Intercity Express
Rangiya–New Tinsukia Express

References 

Lumding railway division
Railway stations in Hojai district